WAXO (1220 AM/95.9 FM) was a radio station formerly broadcasting a country music and classic rock format. Licensed to Lewisburg, Tennessee, United States, the station, prior to its bankruptcy, was owned and operated by Marshall County Radio Corporation and featured programming from Westwood One.  It also operated a low-power television station on digital channel 29 (formerly seen on analog channel 34).

WAXO went on the air September 1, 1980. The WAXO call letters were previously used by the present-day WWDV in Zion, Illinois, when it was located in Kenosha, Wisconsin.

WAXO radio and television carried a wide selection of local sports including Marshall County sports, Forrest High School sports, and Cornersville High School sports. The station is also an affiliate of the Tennessee Titans radio network.

In March, 2016 WAXO (AM), FM translator W240CC and WAXO (TV) went off the air due to owners, Marshall County Radio Corporation, filing for Chapter 11 bankruptcy, as there were no funds to continue operations of the stations. Special temporary authority had been granted by the Federal Communications Commission to keep WAXO (AM) silent for up to one year. After having been off the air for more than one year, WAXO (AM)'s license expired on March 25, 2017. The license of the 95.9 MHz translator W240CC was cancelled on June 7, 2017 for the same reason.

Former television sister station
See main article: WFET-LD

References

External links
FCC Station Search Details: DWAXO (Facility ID: 40456)
FCC History Cards for WAXO (covering 1976-1981)

AXO
Defunct radio stations in the United States
Radio stations established in 1980
1980 establishments in Tennessee
Radio stations disestablished in 2017
2017 disestablishments in Tennessee
AXO